École Secondaire Georges-Vanier is a public high school in Laval, Quebec. It is named for Governor General of Canada Georges Vanier. It is a part of the Commission scolaire de Laval.

Special programs

In 1994, a program named "Sport-études" was founded and created by Robert Lalande (1951-2013). It is still used at Georges-Vanier. It was a program that allowed athletes to train on a regular schedule while being able to go to school at the same time without having to make a sacrifice towards one. Today, this program includes a wide range of sports such as hockey, tennis, skiing, soccer and more.

In 2006, another program was founded by the music department. It explores theatrical and musical domains. Since, there has been multiple representation of shows, such as Rock n' Nonne, Starmania (Tycoon), and some shows that were created by the students and teachers.

Notable alumni

Eliezer Sherbatov (born 1991), Canadian-Israeli ice hockey player

External links
 School website 

Georges-Vanier
Georges-Vanier